Melvin Poh is a Malaysian entrepreneur, barrister, investor and speaker. He is known for his work as a media entrepreneur in crowdsourcing knowledge in Asia and his efforts to facilitate greater accessibility to knowledge in the region. Poh is also known to be a public proponent of the access to knowledge movement in Southeast Asia and has been advocating for the democratization of knowledge in public media as well as in his work.

Early life and education 
Poh was born in Malaysia but had emigrated and spent most of his years living in New Zealand, Australia, United States and United Kingdom. He attended Hale School. He later pursued studies at Harvard University, Imperial College London and University of Cambridge. Poh then became a Barrister-at-Law in the United Kingdom and an admitted member of the Honourable Society of Lincoln's Inn.

Career

The Asian Entrepreneur 
In 2013, Poh founded The Asian Entrepreneur with another student at Harvard. The Asian Entrepreneur began in the United States as a print publication documenting business knowledge in Asia. The print publication was later developed by Poh into a digital crowdpublishing platform that allowed users to participate in the production of content and the editorial process through an open collaboration model. The Asian Entrepreneur then became an open access platform for accessing, exchanging and publishing business knowledge across Asia. The organization had worked with Southeast Asian governments on various startup initiatives for open access knowledge and education. In 2021 after raising funds, The Asian Entrepreneur was further expanded and officially rebranded to Empirics Asia.

Empirics Asia 
In January 2021, Poh and his team raised US$8 million for The Asian Entrepreneur to expand its publishing scope further and it was officially renamed to Empirics Asia. Empirics Asia was launched as an open access knowledge platform modeled on empiricism that incorporated social journalism, open publishing and crowdsourcing from Asia to publish direct insights on social scientific fields. Through the expanded publishing coverage, Empirics Asia worked with authors and experts to crowdsource knowledge and publish topics ranging from technology, psychology, philosophy, sociology, business, literature, economics, science and arts. Without operating a conventional paywall, content sponsorship and advertising, the platform aimed to contribute to the democratization of knowledge. The organization also established a publishing and distribution operation for sourcing original titles and books from authors in Asia. In July 2021, Poh launched Empirics Podcast, an open access knowledge podcast produced and hosted by a machine learning artificial intelligence that was developed by the organization to study knowledge trends. As of September 2021, the organization has crowdsourced and published 1 million open access knowledge content in the social sciences from its network of writers and volunteers.

Public Keynotes 
Poh regularly shared insights and advocated in the public forum. In 2018, Poh was invited to speak about collective knowledge at The Harvard Project for Asian and International Relations Conference organised by Harvard University. In May 2018, he spoke at TEDxSUTD in Singapore on knowledge creation through digital media and advocated for democratization of media. In March 2019, he delivered a speech on the evolution of entrepreneurship at TEDxUMSKK and was also a keynote speaker at TEDxHeriotWatt sharing views on sustainable economic developments. In September 2019, the Securities Commission Malaysia invited Poh to speak on panel at its Business Foresight Forum held at the Securities Industry Development Corporation where he advocated for the need of open access media. In 2020, he was invited to share his views on the impact of COVID-19 pandemic on entrepreneurship at the Enterprise Asia Center Of Entrepreneurship organised by HELP University and Enterprise Asia. In 2021, Poh delivered a keynote on the transformations of human meaning in the digital age at TEDxAIMST.

Investments 
Poh has been an active private equity investor. In 2013, he co-founded an investment company that specialised in sourcing private equity for collegiate entrepreneurs and startup companies from Australia, United Kingdom and United States. In 2018, Poh became the second largest shareholder of De Clout, a SGX publicly listed company in Singapore by acquiring a 11.8% personal stake in the company. In August 2018, he had joined other investors in the development of several real estate in Singapore and co-founded a property development firm specializing in Singaporean real estate development. In 2021, it was revealed that Poh had an invested stake in a textile manufacturing plant based in Malaysia that specialized in interior building materials.

Recognition 
In 2019, Poh was among the 30 entrepreneurs admitted on the Forbes 30 Under 30 list, for fostering education through crowdsourcing knowledge in Asia. In the following year, he was listed on Prestige 40 Under 40 for contributing to open access knowledge in the region through digital crowdpublishing. In 2021, Poh was named among the 30 honourees of industry leaders on Tatler's Generation.T Leaders Of Tomorrow list for creating an open access knowledge hub in Asia and making contributions to regional education. In 2022, Poh was one of the 4 Malaysians whose work was recognized by British High Commission and HE Charles Hay; he subsequently was the recipient of the Business & Innovation Award from the British Council, for his work in improving accessibility to knowledge in Asia.

References 

Living people
Malaysian mass media people
Malaysian businesspeople
Year of birth missing (living people)
Malaysian investors